Shizhong is a district of the city of Neijiang, Sichuan Province, China.

Districts of Sichuan
Neijiang